Quillian is a surname. Notable people with this surname include:

Lincoln Quillian, American sociologist
Natalie Quillian, American political strategist 
Ronnie Quillian (1934–2016), Canadian football player
Sylvie Quillian (born 1980), Canadian curler
William Quillian (disambiguation), several people